The 1841 Georgia gubernatorial election was held on October 4, 1841.

The Incumbent Governor Charles McDonald won re-election defeating Whig candidate William C. Dawson.

The election was decided by 4,133 votes.

General election

Candidates

Democratic 

 Charles McDonald, Incumbent Governor.

Whig 

 William C. Dawson, Former House Representative.

Results

References 

Georgia (U.S. state) gubernatorial elections
Gubernatorial
Georgia